Glad All Over Again is a compilation album by The Dave Clark Five, released in 1993.

Track listing
 "Glad All Over" (Dave Clark, Mike Smith) – 2:41
 "Do You Love Me" (Berry Gordy, Jr.) – 2:25
 "Bits and Pieces" (Clark, Smith, Ron Ryan) – 1:59
 "Can't You See That She's Mine" (Clark, Smith) – 2:21
 "Don't Let Me Down" (Clark, Smith) – 1:41
 "Everybody Knows (I Still Love You)" (Clark, Lenny Davidson) – 1:42
 "Any Way You Want It" (Clark) – 2:40
 "Catch Us If You Can" (Clark, Davidson) – 1:55
 "Having a Wild Weekend" (Clark, Smith) – 1:42
 "Because" (Clark) – 2:24 
 "I Like It Like That" (Allen Toussaint, Chris Kenner) –  1:38
 "Over and Over" (Robert Byrd) – 2:01
 "Reelin' and Rockin'" (Chuck Berry) – 2:48
 "Come Home" (Clark, Smith) – 2:51
 "You Got What It Takes" (Tyran Carlo, Gwen Fuqua, Gordy Jr., Marv Johnson) – 3:00
 "Everybody Knows" (Barry Mason, Les Reed) – 2:23
 "Try Too Hard" (Clark, Smith) – 2:09 
 "I'll Be Yours My Love" (Clark, Smith) – 2:42
 "Good Old Rock & Roll" – 3:48
"Good Old Rock and Roll"
"Sweet Little Sixteen" (Chuck Berry)
"Long Tall Sally" (Enotris Johnson, Robert Blackwell, Richard Penniman)
"Chantilly Lace" (JP Richardson)
"Whole Lotta Shakin' Goin' On" (Dave "Curlee" Williams)
"Blue Suede Shoes" (Carl Perkins)
 "Here Comes Summer" (Jerry Keller) – 2:48
 "Live in the Sky" (Clark, Smith) – 2:42 
 "The Red Balloon" (Raymond Froggatt) – 
 "Sha-Na-Na Hey Hey Kiss Him Goodbye" (Paul Leka, Gary DeCarlo, Dale Frashuer) – 3:19
 "More Good Old Rock & Roll" – 2:58
"Rock n' Roll Music" (Berry) 
"Blueberry Hill" (Larry Stock, Al Lewis, Vincent Rose)
"Good Golly Miss Molly" (John Marascalco, Robert "Bumps" Blackwell) 
"My Blue Heaven" (Walter Donaldson, George A. Whiting)
"Keep a Knockin'" (Penniman)
 "Put a Little Love In Your Heart" (Jackie DeShannon, Jimmy Holiday, Randy Myers) – 2:59
 "Everybody Get Together" (Chet Powers) – 3:18

Personnel

The Dave Clark Five
Dave Clark – backing and occasional lead vocals, drums 
Mike Smith – lead vocals, keyboards 
Lenny Davidson – backing and occasional lead vocals, lead and rhythm guitars 
Rick Huxley – backing vocals, bass guitar, rhythm guitar
Denis Payton – backing and occasional lead vocals, tenor and baritone saxophones, harmonica, rhythm guitar

Technical
 Dave Clark – producer
 Adrian Clark – producer (track 7)
 Andy Engel – cover design
 Hank Parker – photography

References

1993 compilation albums
The Dave Clark Five albums
EMI Records compilation albums